This is a list of diplomatic missions in Houston. Many foreign governments have established diplomatic and trade representation in the city of Houston. Houston is one of the cities with the most consulate-general offices in the United States. Additionally some trade offices exist.

Consulates General and honorary consulates in Houston

Former Consulates General in Houston

Diplomatic missions